Eremophila retropila is a flowering plant in the figwort family, Scrophulariaceae and is endemic to Western Australia. It is an erect, spreading shrub with hairy, greyish leaves crowded at the ends of the branches, and lilac or violet-coloured flowers which are white inside.

Description
The branches and leaves are covered with a dense layer of simple greyish-white hairs. The hairs on the branches are long and curve downwards.

The petal tube is violet or lilac-coloured and white inside with small violet spots. The petal tube and lobes are hairy on the outside, the lobes are mostly glabrous on the inside but the tube is inside of the tube is filled with woolly hairs. The 4 stamens are fully enclosed in the petal tube.

Taxonomy and naming 
This species was first formally described by Robert Chinnock in 2007 and the description was published in Eremophila and Allied Genera: A Monograph of the Plant Family Myoporaceae. The specific epithet (retropila) is derived from the Latin words retro meaning "back" or "backwards" and pilus meaning "hair" or "felt", referring to the bent hairs on the branches.

Distribution and habitat
Eremophila retropila grows on stony flats near Meekatharra in the Murchison biogeographic region.

Conservation
This eremophila is classified as "Priority One" by the Western Australian Government Department of Parks and Wildlife, meaning that it is known from only one or a few locations which are potentially at risk.

References

Eudicots of Western Australia
retropila
Endemic flora of Western Australia
Plants described in 2007
Taxa named by Robert Chinnock